Paolo Bianco (born 20 August 1977) is an Italian football coach and former footballer who played as a defender.

Career

U.S. Foggia
Bianco started his career within the junior ranks of U.S. Foggia, in the Italian Serie B. In 1994, the player was promoted to the first team and began to make official league appearances for his hometown club. The player did not manage to break into the club's starting line-up in his first season, making just 13 appearances, but eventually earned well over 100 caps for the club in all competitions also netting 2 official goals. The central defender was then transferred to Serie B side Treviso F.B.C. 1993, in the summer of 1999, for an undisclosed transfer fee.

Treviso
Bianco's transfer to the northern club was a big step in the players career, as he instantly became a key member in the team, and eventually earned the captain's armband for his club. In his first season in Treviso, Bianco made 16 appearances, and followed that up with 22 starts the following season. His efforts were not enough to save his club from relegation, however, and he spent the next two seasons in the Serie C1. After 60 Serie C1 appearances, Bianco captained his team to promotion back into the Italian second division, and made 44 appearances for the club that season, more than any other player in the team. After five seasons, with the club, Bianco made 148 league appearances alone, and scored 6 goals, while making over 160 appearances for his club in all competitions. His good form led to a 2004 transfer to Serie B rivals Calcio Catania.

Catania
The player arrived at the Sicilian club in the summer of 2004. He became a regular fixture in the club's line-up and made 37 league appearances in his first season in Sicily. His impressive displays continued the following season as he made an additional 35 league appearances and helped guide the club to a second-place finish in the Serie B table, and hence, Serie A promotion. Despite helping to lead the club into the Serie A, the player was loaned to fellow Serie A side Cagliari Calcio in August 2006.

Cagliari
Following his transfer from one Italian island to the other, the defender instantly was inserted into the Sardinian club's starting eleven as well. His Serie A debut came against former side, Catania. In his first season in the top flight, Bianco made a total of 35 league appearances and also scored a solo goal. In June 2007, the club excised the rights to buy him. His second season, proved to be much of the same as the player made 31 appearances as both a central defender and a right back. Bianco entered the 2008–09 Serie A campaign with just one year left on his contract. In January 2010 he signed a pre-contract with Atalanta.

Atalanta
Bianco made the move to Bergamo following the expiration of his contract with Cagliari on 1 July 2009. In his first season with Atalanta, Bianco made 21 league appearances, with 20 of them coming from the starting XI. Despite a close relegation battle towards the end of the 2009–10 campaign, between Livorno, Siena, Atalanta, Chievo, Udinese, and Bologna, his club failed in their efforts to avoid the bad fate. On 19 July 2010, his contract was terminated in mutual consent.

Sassuolo
Bianco made his debut on Sassuolo's defeat against Portogruaro. Bianco was re-signed by Sassuolo in a one-year contract on 17 July 2014.

Coaching career
He was appointed head coach of Sicula Leonzio in Serie C on 18 June 2018. On 9 December 2018, he resigned from Sicula Leonzio, with the club in 10th place in the table. In October 2019, Bianco was hired as a part of Roberto De Zerbi's first team technical staff at Sassuolo.

References

External links
Gazzetta dello Sport player profile 
Bianco in Sassuolo 
Bianco in Sassuolo website

1977 births
Living people
Italian footballers
Calcio Foggia 1920 players
Treviso F.B.C. 1993 players
Catania S.S.D. players
Cagliari Calcio players
Atalanta B.C. players
U.S. Sassuolo Calcio players
Serie A players
Serie B players
Serie C players
Association football defenders
Italian football managers
Italian expatriate sportspeople in Ukraine
FC Shakhtar Donetsk non-playing staff